Broadwell is a surname, probably derived from placenames in Britain. Notable people with the surname include:

 Cyrus Broadwell (1801–1879), builder of Cyrus Broadwell House
 Lewis Wells Broadwell (1820–1906), American engineer and inventor of firearms and artillery components
 Lucina C. Broadwell (c. 1890–1919), American murder victim
 Robert Broadwell (fl. 1919), director of The Great Radium Mystery
 James Eugene Broadwell (1921–2018), American aeronautical engineer 
 Charles Broadwell (fl. 2000s), publisher of The Fayetteville Observer 
 Paula Broadwell (fl. 2012), American biographer of Gen. David Petraeus

Fictional characters
 Amanda Broadwell, in web series The Cavanaughs